The 2000 European 10,000m Cup, was the 4th edition of the European 10,000m Cup (the original name in 2000 was European 10,000m Challenge) and took place on 1 April in Lisbon, Portugal.

Individual

Men

Women

Team
In italic the participants whose result did not go into the team's total time, but awarded with medals.

Men

Women

References

External links
 EAA web site

European 10,000m Cup
European Cup 10,000m